Studyonovka is a rural locality (a settlement) in Yacheyskoye Rural Settlement, Ertilsky District, Voronezh Oblast, Russia. The population was 16 as of 2010.

Geography 
Studyonovka is located 17 km northwest of Ertil (the district's administrative centre) by road. Golevka is the nearest rural locality.

References 

Rural localities in Ertilsky District